The Interrogation is a 2009 Finnish war drama film directed by Jörn Donner.

The plot focuses on the interrogation of Kerttu Nuorteva (played by Minna Haapkylä, who won the Jussi Award for best lead actress for her performance) during the Continuation War.

Cast
Minna Haapkylä as Kerttu Nuorteva
Marcus Groth as Paavo Kastari
Hannu-Pekka Björkman as Toivo Suominen
Lauri Nurkse as Otto Kumenius
Kristiina Elstelä as Mrs. Grahn
Rea Mauranen as Dr. Schwanck
Pertti Sveholm as Arvo Tuominen
Mikko Reitala as Arno Anthoni

References

External links 
 

2000s war drama films
Films directed by Jörn Donner
Films set in Finland
Films shot in Finland
Finnish war drama films
2000s spy films
2009 drama films
2009 films
Finnish World War II films
2000s Finnish-language films